Dead on Time could mean:

"Dead on Time" (1978), single from the rock band Queen on their album Jazz
Dead on Time (1983), British short film directed by Lyndall Hobbs and written by Richard Curtis and Rowan Atkinson
Dead on Time (1988), novel in the Inspector Ghote series from English crime fiction writer H. R. F. Keating
"Dead on Time" (1992), episode of the British television series Inspector Morse
"Dead on Time" (1996), episode of the British television series Murder Most Horrid
Dead on Time (1999), British short film directed by James Larkin and written by Larkin and Jon Sen
"Dead on Time" (2000), episode of the Australian medical drama All Saints
Dead on Time (2007), novel by South African writer Glyn Jones
Dead on Time (2009), novel by Indian-British writer, economist, and Labour politician Meghnad Desai, Baron Desai